MICappella is a Singaporean a cappella group. They made their debut after competing in the Chinese edition of The Sing-Off, where they won second place. 

The band appeared at National Day Parade 2018 and 2022 Celebrations and Singapore Day 2019 in Shanghai. That same year, they were also invited to perform their rendition of the National Anthem during the Singapore Grand Prix Flag-off ceremony.

MICappella has released three albums till date. Their latest 2019 EP “LOVE, MICappella” was awarded Outstanding Asian Album and Best Original Song by a Professional Group. The band has performed in Europe, Australia, China, USA, Russia, Malaysia, and many more.

History

Pre-debut (2009–2012) 
When MICappella was formed in 2009, only half of its members were full-time musicians.

The group performed during the 2010 Singapore Youth Olympics and the 2011 Singapore E-Awards. The band also represented Singapore at Taiwan's premier singing competition "Super Idol 5" in 2011 and was the only Southeast Asian group invited to perform alongside singer-songwriter Khalil Fong during the 2010 Hong Kong International A Cappella Extravaganza. 

In 2012, MICappella represented Singapore to take part in the Sing-Off China, an adaption of the American reality television competition, The Sing-Off. The band spent a close to 3 months in Shenzhen, China where they emerged as First Runners Up. This was the point where the band made a switch to a full-time professional a cappella group.

Debut album, contract and China tour (2013–2014) 
In 2013, the band performed at several international festivals, including SoJam (United States), "AMC Live!" (Chengdu, China), the Fringe Arts Festival (Shenzhen, China) and the Strawberry Festival (Beijing and Shanghai, China).

MICappella was signed to record label S2S Pte. Ltd. in January 2013. On 16 April 2013, they released their debut album Here We Go, which consists of two original songs: "Here We Go" and "Whatever" (算了吧). On 31 May 2013, the group held a sold-out concert titled "Late Nite @ Esplanade: MICappella – Here We Go" at Esplanade Recital Studio. At the Singapore Hit Awards 2013, the group won the "Local Media Nominated Singer" award.

On 11 October 2014, MICappella was the guest performer for Khalil Fong's Singapore "Soulboy Lights Up" concert. The group then started touring China, with their first stop at Shanghai Daning Music Festival on 19 October 2014. Soon after, MICappella was recommended by Singapore Deputy Prime Minister Teo Chee Hean to perform at "The Art Performance for the 20th Anniversary of China Singapore Cooperative Suzhou Industrial Park" as Singaporean representatives on 26 October 2014, and the band actively toured the region.

European tour and MICappella Reloaded (2014–2016) 
In late 2014, YK Teng left the group and was replaced with photographer-singer Goh Mingwei. In January 2015, Lee Ein Ein left to study music in Los Angeles. She was replaced with Tay Kexin, the younger sister of Tay Kewei. It was also announced that the band would embark on its European tour to perform in the UK, Germany and Holland.

In December 2015, MICappella released a mashup video of Hu Xia's "Those Years" from You Are the Apple of My Eye and Hebe Tien's "A Little Happiness" from Our Times. The video reached one million views on Facebook five days after its release. It was also announced that they would release new material in 2016.

On 29 February 2016, MICappella released "One Of These Days". They planned to release their second album, MICappella Reloaded, on 26 May 2016, featuring original songs. In June 2016, MICappella was signed to Universal Music Singapore.

Members

Current members
Calin Wong – alto (2009–present)
Juni Goh – tenor (2010–present)
Peter Huang – tenor, vocal percussion, leader (2009–present)
Eugene Yip – baritone, vocal percussion (2009–present)
Goh Mingwei – bass (2014–present)
Tay Kexin – soprano (2015–present)

Former members
Ng Weijin – bass (2010–2013)
YK Teng – bass (2013–14)
Lee Ein Ein – soprano (2010–2015)

Timeline

Discography

Albums

EPs

Singles

Awards and nominations

Music charts

External links
 MICappella Website
 MICappella YouTube Channel
MICappella Facebook Page
MICappella Instagram
MICappella Tiktok Channel
MICappella Spotify
MICappella Apple Music

References

Musical groups established in 2009
Professional a cappella groups
Singaporean musical groups